Andrea Szalay (born May 20, 1976, Budapest) is a retired Hungarian rhythmic gymnast.

She represented Hungary in the individual rhythmic gymnastics all-around competition at two Olympic Games: in 1992 in Barcelona and in 1996 in Atlanta. In 1992 she was 28th in the qualification round and didn't advance to the final, in 1996 she was 36th in the qualification round and didn't advance to the semifinal.

References

External links 
 

1976 births
Living people
Hungarian rhythmic gymnasts
Gymnasts at the 1992 Summer Olympics
Gymnasts at the 1996 Summer Olympics
Olympic gymnasts of Hungary
Gymnasts from Budapest